is a former Japanese football player and current first-team coach J2 League club of Júbilo Iwata.

Playing career
Nishino was born in Toyama on September 14, 1982. After graduating from high school, he joined J1 League club Júbilo Iwata in 2001. Although he played as forward, he could not play many matches behind Masashi Nakayama, Naohiro Takahara, Ryoichi Maeda, Rodrigo Gral and so on. In April 2005, he moved to Júbilo's cross town rivals, Shimizu S-Pulse on loan. He played many matches as substitute forward. In 2006, he returned to Júbilo. However he could hardly play in the match. In 2007, he moved to J2 League club Kyoto Sanga FC. He played many matches as substitute forward and the club was promoted to J1 from 2008. However he could hardly score goals. In 2009, he was converted to right side back. However he injured his left knee before opening 2009 season and he could not play at all in the match in 2009 season. Although he came back in 2010 season, he could not play many matches and the club was relegated to J2 end of 2010 season. In 2011, he moved to Japan Football League club Kamatamare Sanuki. He played as regular forward and scored many goals. The club was also promoted to J2 from 2014 season. He retired end of 2014 season.

Club statistics

References

External links

1982 births
Living people
Association football people from Toyama Prefecture
Japanese footballers
J1 League players
J2 League players
Japan Football League players
Júbilo Iwata players
Shimizu S-Pulse players
Kyoto Sanga FC players
Kamatamare Sanuki players
Association football defenders
Association football forwards